Jasmineira is a genus of polychaetes.

References 

 Dialychone, Jasmineira and Paradialychone (Annelida: Polychaeta: Sabellidae) from Japan and adjacent waters, including four new species descriptions. E Nishi, K Tanaka, MA Tovar-Hernández... - Zootaxa, 2009
 A new genus and family of copepods (Crustacea: Copepoda) parasitic on polychaetes of the genus Jasmineira Langerhans, 1880 (family Sabellidae) in the ...GA Boxshall, M O'Reilly, A Sikorski, R Summerfield - Zootaxa,

External links 

Sabellida
Polychaete genera